Clathrus mauritianus is a species of fungus in the stinkhorn family. It is found in Mauritius.

References

Phallales
Fungi of Africa
Fungi described in 1910
Fungi of Mauritius